Stain is the first EP release by the Canadian rock band Mystery Machine.

Track listing
"Shaky Ground" (3:12)
"Three-Fisted" (3:59)
"Stay High" (2:27)
"Ride (Live)" (4:59)

1992 EPs
Mystery Machine (band) albums